XEIX-AM is a radio station on 1290 AM in Jiquilpan, Michoacán, Mexico. It is owned by Promoradio and known as Super Éxitos.

History
XEIX received its concession on June 22, 1965. It was owned by José Luis Lemus Orozco.

It is the sister to a station in Sahuayo, XERNB-AM 1450.

References

Radio stations in Michoacán
Radio stations established in 1965